Kamak-e Khodadad (also Romanized as Kamak-e Khodādād; also known as Chamech, Chamesh, Kamak, Kamak-e Soflá, and Kamek) is a village in Ludab Rural District, Ludab District, Boyer-Ahmad County, Kohgiluyeh and Boyer-Ahmad Province, Iran. At the 2006 census, its population was 86, in 17 families.

References 

Populated places in Boyer-Ahmad County